Sylwia Korzeniowska (born 25 April 1980 in Tarnobrzeg) is a Polish-born French race walker. She changed her nationality on June 1, 2010. She is the younger sister of former world record holder Robert Korzeniowski.

Achievements

See also
Polish records in athletics

References

1980 births
Living people
Polish female racewalkers
Athletes (track and field) at the 2004 Summer Olympics
Athletes (track and field) at the 2008 Summer Olympics
Olympic athletes of Poland
Sportspeople from Kalisz
Polish emigrants to France
French female racewalkers